Girj Gerdeh (also Romanized as Grīj Gerdeh; also known as Kach Kardeh, Gīj Gardan, Gīj Gerdeh, and Gīrj Gereh) is a village in Koregah-e Sharqi Rural District, in the Central District of Khorramabad County, Lorestan Province, Iran. At the 2006 census, its population was 51, in 12 families.

References 

Towns and villages in Khorramabad County